In the 1933 season of the Campeonato Carioca, two championships were disputed, each by a different league.

AMEA Championship 

After the 1932 championship, talks began among the seven main clubs of the AMEA league to discuss whether to adopt professionalism, like APEA in São Paulo had done before, or not. However, after the league's statue was first drafted, only América, Bangu and Fluminense accepted it, although they were joined by Vasco da Gama, which reversed its previous position on that matter. The four teams were consequently expelled from AMEA, which was resolved to remain amateur. Later on, Bonsucesso joined them, and CBD took a stance against professionalism, prompting LCF and APEA to break with CBD and form a rival confederation called the FBF (Federação Brasileira de Football). to bolster its importance, LCF and APEA agreed on the creation of an interstate tournament between the five LCF teams and seven APEA teams, the Rio-São Paulo Tournament. Meanwhile, other minor teams also joined LCF, and were organized into an affiliated league called the Subliga Carioca de Football (Carioca Football Subleague).

Meanwhile, AMEA promoted a number of teams from the second level to organize a thirteen-team championship and began their championship before LCF, on April 30, 1933. However, only four weeks into the championship, Carioca, Flamengo and São Cristóvão left AMEA and tried to join LCF. Flamengo, runners-up of the previous year's championship, were accepted, even though they couldn't join the Rio-São Paulo tournament, which was already underway, but Carioca and São Cristóvão had to play in the Subliga instead.

The edition of the Campeonato Carioca organized by AMEA ended on December 3, 1933. Botafogo won the championship for the 6th time. no teams were relegated.

Participating teams

System 
The tournament would be disputed in a double round-robin format, with the team with the most points winning the title.

Championship

LCF Championship 

The edition of the Campeonato Carioca organized by LCF (Liga Carioca de Football, or Carioca Football League) kicked off on May 7, 1933, and ended on November 15, 1933. Six teams participated. Bangu won the championship for the 1st time. no teams were relegated.

Participating teams

System 
The tournament would be disputed in a double round-robin format, with the team with the most points winning the title.

Championship

References 

Campeonato Carioca seasons
Carioca